This is a partial list of pinball manufacturers of past and present organized alphabetically by name. The article only includes producers of pinball machines at least in a small series which excludes makers of single unit custom pinball machines.

Present
American Pinball
Chicago Gaming Company
Dutch Pinball
Haggis Pinball
Homepin Taiwan Co. Ltd.
Jersey Jack Pinball
Multimorphic Inc
Pawlowski Pinball
Penny K Pinball
Phenix Pinball (French Company)
Quetzal Pinball
Spooky Pinball
Stern Pinball
Team Pinball
Pinball Brothers
Pinball Adventures

Past
Allied Leisure (Centuri)
Alvin G
Atari
Bally Manufacturing
Bill Port
Capcom Coin-Op, a subsidiary of Capcom
Centro Matic
Coffee-Mat
Chicago Coin
Data East
Exhibit Supply Company
Fascination Int., Inc (Allied Leisure)
Game Plan
Genco
Gottlieb
Hankin
Heighway Pinball
Inder
InterFlip/Recreativos Franco
Jennings & Company
Jeutel pinball
LTD of Brazil
Nordamatic
Nuova Bell/Bell Games
Maresa
Mirco Games
Midway Games
Pinstar
Mr. Game
Peyper
Playmatic
Rally Play
Recel/Petaco
Sega Pinball
Sega, S.A. SONIC
Spinball S.A.L.
SunCoast Pinball
Taito of Brazil
United Manufacturing
tecnoplay
The Valley Company
Viza
Wico
Williams Electronics / WMS Industries
Zaccaria
Zidware

See also
 List of pinball machines
 Glossary of pinball terms

External links
The Internet Pinball Machine Database with a list of more than 700 pinball manufacturers

Pinball